Beane is a surname. Notable people with the surname include:

Anthony Beane (born 1994), American basketball player
Billy Beane (born 1962), American baseball player and executive
Brandon Beane (born 1976), general manager of the NFL's Buffalo Bills since 2017
Carl Beane (1952–2012), American radio sports announcer
Douglas Carter Beane, American playwright and screenwriter
James Dudley Beane (1896-1916), American World War I flying ace
John Beane (c. 1503–1580), English politician
Vanilla Beane (1919–2022), American milliner
Violett Beane (born 1996), American actress

See also
Bean (name)